Ab Zalu-ye Olya-ye Neqareh Khaneh (also Romanized as Āb Zālū-ye ‘Olyā-ye Neqāreh Khāneh; also known as Āb Zālū-ye Bālā and Āb Zālū-ye ‘Olyā) is a village in Kabgian Rural District, Kabgian District, Dana County, Kohgiluyeh and Boyer-Ahmad Province, Iran. At the 2006 census, its population was 44, in 11 families.

References 

Populated places in Dana County